Maddison Gay (born 28 September 1996) is an Australian rules footballer playing for Melbourne in the AFL Women's (AFLW). She was recruited by Carlton in May 2017 as a rookie signing after previously playing netball. She made her debut in the eight point win against  at Ikon Park in the opening round of the 2018 season.

Ahead of the 2019 season, Gay was traded to Melbourne as part of a three-way deal in which Amelia Barden moved from Collingwood to Carlton.

References

External links 

1996 births
Living people
Carlton Football Club (AFLW) players
Australian rules footballers from Victoria (Australia)
Melbourne Football Club (AFLW) players